Edakochi is one of the oldest districts in southern Kochi (or Cochin), India. It borders Palluruthy to the northwest and is separated from Aroor to the south and Kumbalam, Ernakulam to the east by the Kerala backwaters.

Bridges and roads 

The Edakochi Kannangatt Bridge links Kannangat to the Indian Maritime University junction on NH 966B (Kundanoor Willingdon Highway). It was constructed by the Kerala Public Works Department.

The Edakochi Kannangat Willingdon Island Bridge was opened to the public in September 2017 by the Minister of Works, G. Sudhakaran, bringing the city closer to the Thevara and Kundanoor regions.

Buildings 
Edakochi is home to the proposed site for the Kerala Cricket Association Stadium.

Edakochi's St. Lawrence's Church has gained fame as the burial place of Monsignor Lawrence Puliyanath. The church at Edakochin is one of the oldest churches in Edakochi. The first church is believed to have been built around the time of the departure of Saint Thomas Christians from Cranganore (Kodungallur). At that time, Cranganore had three important centers: Mattancherry, Mundamveli, and Edakochi. There seems to have been a church at Edakochi since the 9th century, as there were at Mattancherry and Mundamveli. This ancient church was dedicated to "The Three Kings".

Schools and libraries 
Schools and libraries in Edakochi include:
 Edakochi Govt. High School
 St. Lawrence UP School
 St. Mary's LP School
 Jnanodayam Public School 
 Santhi Vidyalaya College
 Aquinas College
 Siena College
 Avila B.Ed. College
 Pandit Karuppan Memorial Public Library and Reading Room

Location

References 

Neighbourhoods in Kochi